iodéOS is an Android-based mobile operating system developed by French company iodé. The operating system is a fork of LineageOS and does not include Google Play Services, instead using MicroG as a free and open-source replacement.

Software 
iodéOS is presented as a privacy-oriented LineageOS combined with MicroG and a Firewall. From 2020 through November 2022, IodéOS was closed source and included proprietary apps. In November 2022, the company announced it was releasing version 3.3 as "open source" with options for uninstalling default apps. No license terms were specified, but multiple licenses can be found in each repository on Gitlab, including "No license. All rights reserved" (proprietary).

Reception 
According to Stefan Mey of Heise.de and "Sunny" of tarnkappe.info, iodéOS includes hosts file based ad and tracker blocking. According to "Sunny" of tarnkappe.info, users may install a VPN or an additional adblocker. According to Stefan Mey of heise.de, the operating system comes with F-Droid and Aurora Store app stores pre-installed. Manuel Vonau of AndroidPolice.com said it was "good" that the setup of a pre-installed phone isn't "much more complicated than with any other phone." However, inclusion of the Aurora Store meant the operating system still communicated with Google APIs and breaks Google's Terms of Service, but no warning is given.

References

External links 
 

Android forks
Custom Android firmware
Free mobile software
Mobile operating systems